Benjamin Harrison Fletcher (April 13, 1890 – 1949) was an early 20th-century African-American labor leader and public speaker. He was a prominent member of the Industrial Workers of the World (IWW, or the "Wobblies"), a left-wing trade union which was influential during his time. In an era when few African Americans were permitted in American unions and fewer still belonged to more left-wing organizations, Fletcher was nationally known. Fletcher co-founded and helped lead the interracial Local 8 branch of the IWW’s Marine Transport Workers Industrial Union.

Early life
Benjamin Harrison Fletcher was born in Philadelphia, Pennsylvania on April 13, 1890. He worked as a day laborer and a longshoreman, loading and unloading ships. Fletcher joined the IWW and the Socialist Party around 1912. He first heard IWW soapbox speakers addressing working class audiences in riverside neighborhoods.  Shortly thereafter, Fletcher became a leader of the IWW in Philadelphia, beginning a career in public speaking that won him many accolades.

Local 8 

Fletcher, along with other Industrial Workers of the World (IWW) members, co-founded Local 8 of the Marine Transport Workers Industrial Union in Philadelphia in 1913. Local 8 was unique in that it was an interracial union, with about one-third of its members being African American, another one-third being Irish American, and the remaining one-third largely composed of other European immigrants. In May 1913, thousands of longshoremen went on strike for better wages and for recognition of their new union. Upon its formation, Fletcher helped lead Local 8. Local 8 espoused anti-capitalist and anti-racism rhetoric, and were subject to redbaiting by dockyard bosses and local government officials. By 1916, all but two of Philadelphia's docks were under IWW control. Local 8 exercised considerable control of Philadelphia's waterfront for about a decade.

Subsequent organizing efforts 
Following the successful organization of Local 8 in Philadelphia, Ben Fletcher traveled up and down the United States' eastern seaboard on behalf of the Industrial Workers of the World. In a 1931 interview with the Amsterdam News, his only known interview, Fletcher recalled escaping a potential lynching while trying to organize a union among dock workers in Norfolk, Virginia in 1917. From there, he escaped to Boston, where he continued his organizing activities for a brief period of time.

Treason arrest and sentence 

While in Boston, Fletcher learned that he was to be indicted for his organizing activities. From there, he returned to Philadelphia, where he said that he "preferred to be placed under arrest". Upon his return, Fletcher and 165 other union activists were publicly indicted. At that time, the Industrial Workers of the World (IWW) had about 1,000,000 members, including 100,000 black workers who were rejected from other unions, such as the American Federation of Labor. The IWW's organizing ran contrary to the United States' World War I efforts, and Philadelphia was one of the most important ports for the war effort. Though they engaged in but a single work stoppage (Local 8’s anniversary was celebrated annually with a one-day strike), the federal government targeted Local 8’s leaders, Fletcher included, in its national raids on the IWW. Fletcher was arrested on February 9, 1918, and placed under a $10,000 bond. Two weeks later, the district attorney reduced the bond to $1,500, which was promptly paid for by the IWW.

Fletcher was charged with treasonous activities, and was the only African American among the 166 members of the IWW tried. While no direct evidence was provided against Fletcher, Local 8, or even the IWW (most of the “evidence” were statements of the IWW’s anti-capitalist beliefs, not any planned actions to interrupt the war effort), all of the defendants were found guilty—the jury came back in under an hour, all guilty on all counts. Fletcher was fined $30,000 and sentenced to ten years in the Leavenworth federal penitentiary in Kansas. As the sentences were announced, IWW leader Bill Haywood reported that, “Ben Fletcher sidled over to me and said: ‘The Judge has been using very ungrammatical language.’  I looked at his smiling black face and asked: ‘How’s that, Ben?  He said: ‘His sentences are much too long’”.  While in jail, Fletcher’s release became a celebrated cause among African American radicals, championed by The Messenger, a monthly co-edited by A. Philip Randolph. Fletcher served around three years, before his sentence was commuted, along with most of the other jailed Wobblies, in 1922.

Post-release and death 

After his release, Fletcher remained committed to the IWW, though never played as active a role as he had prior to his imprisonment. He stayed involved in Local 8, but was not a central figure. During the 1920s, Fletcher collaborated with the Communist Party USA, where he clashed with Lovett Fort-Whiteman. Later he denounced the organization as insincere, and warned that it was trying to take over the IWW's unions. Fletcher continued to give occasional speeches on tours and street corners into the 1930s. Like other longshoreman, Fletcher faced health problems from a relatively young age. Fletcher later moved to Bedford-Stuyvesant in Brooklyn with his wife, where he worked as a building superintendent, until he died in 1949. He is buried in Brooklyn, New York.

Legacy 

Alongside Hubert Harrison and Lovett Fort-Whiteman, Fletcher was one of the few African American leaders in the revolutionary IWW. The union that he helped lead for a decade, Local 8, stands as a rare example of interracial equality in the early 20th century.

References

Further reading

External links
 Fellow Worker Ben Fletcher - A Legacy of Solidarity
 Ben Fletcher's biography in Libcom.org.

1890 births
1949 deaths
Activists from Philadelphia
African-American activists
American anti-capitalists
American anti-racism activists
Industrial Workers of the World members